NALCO may refer to:

 National Aluminium Company - India's Govt sector Aluminium manufacturer
 Nalco Holding Company - formerly known as Nalco Chemical Company
 Nalconagar, Angul - a town in Angul District, Orissa, India
 Ondeo Nalco - purchased by the Blackstone Group in 2003
 North American Lamp Company - Manufacturers of carbon filament light bulbs until 1973.
 Nationalistic Communist - Political current in Eastern Europe in 1990s.